In Greek mythology, Amphalces (Ancient Greek: Ἀμφάλκης) was an Argive prince as son of King Antiphates and Zeuxippe, daughter of Hippocoon. He was the brother of Oicles, father of the seer Amphiaraus.

Note

References 

Diodorus Siculus, The Library of History translated by Charles Henry Oldfather. Twelve volumes. Loeb Classical Library. Cambridge, Massachusetts: Harvard University Press; London: William Heinemann, Ltd. 1989. Vol. 3. Books 4.59–8. Online version at Bill Thayer's Web Site
Diodorus Siculus, Bibliotheca Historica. Vol 1-2. Immanel Bekker. Ludwig Dindorf. Friedrich Vogel. in aedibus B. G. Teubneri. Leipzig. 1888-1890. Greek text available at the Perseus Digital Library.

Princes in Greek mythology
Mythology of Argos